Samuthiram  is a village in the Arimalamrevenue block of Pudukkottai district, Tamil Nadu, India.

Demographics 

 census, Samuthiram had a total population of 1160 with 516 males and 644 females. Out of the total population 735 people were literate.

References

Villages in Pudukkottai district